Conus tethys is a species of sea snail, a marine gastropod mollusk in the family Conidae, the cone snails and their allies.

Like all species within the genus Conus, these snails are predatory and venomous. They are capable of "stinging" humans, therefore live ones should be handled carefully or not at all.

Description
The size of the shell attains 85 mm.

Distribution
This marine species occurs off the Sulu Archipelago, the Philippines

References

External links
 To World Register of Marine Species
 

tethys
Gastropods described in 2011